Hippeia or Hippea (Ancient Greek: Ἱππεία) is the name of two characters in Greek mythology.

 Hippea, daughter of Antippus. She married Elatus and bore Polyphemus, Caeneus, Ischys and Ampycus.
 Athena Hippeia (or Hippeia Athena, "Athena of Horses"), Athena as a goddess of horses. In this form, she was said to be the daughter of Poseidon and Polyphe, daughter of Oceanus. She was given her name because she was the first to use a chariot.

Notes

References 

 Gaius Julius Hyginus, Fabulae from The Myths of Hyginus translated and edited by Mary Grant. University of Kansas Publications in Humanistic Studies. Online version at the Topos Text Project.
Suida, Suda Encyclopedia translated by Ross Scaife, David Whitehead, William Hutton, Catharine Roth, Jennifer Benedict, Gregory Hays, Malcolm Heath Sean M. Redmond, Nicholas Fincher, Patrick Rourke, Elizabeth Vandiver, Raphael Finkel, Frederick Williams, Carl Widstrand, Robert Dyer, Joseph L. Rife, Oliver Phillips and many others. Online version at the Topos Text Project.

Animal goddesses
Greek goddesses
Epithets of Athena